Claire V. Wiseman (born 1965) is an assistant clinical professor of psychology at the Yale School of Medicine and a practicing clinical Psychologist and researcher who specializes in eating disorders and adolescent body image.

Academic career
Wiseman earned her BA in psychology and economics from Cornell University in 1987, and her MA in social psychology from American University in 1991. She completed her PhD in clinical psychology three years later at American University in 1994. She completed her post-doctoral fellowship in eating disorders at Yale University.

Her research, aimed at determining causes and treatments of eating disorders, has been highly influential. Wiseman is an expert in anorexia nervosa and bulimia nervosa.

References

American women psychologists
American clinical psychologists
American women social scientists
Cornell University alumni
1965 births
Living people
21st-century American women
American social psychologists